Nomad.NET is a freeware orthodox file manager (OFM) for Microsoft Windows. Some features include a built-in FTP client, archive file navigation, folder comparison and synchronization, and a multi-file renaming tool. In addition to being an orthodox file manager, Nomad.NET features two-windowed mode, tree window for each panel, horizontal and vertical splitting of the windows, tab browsing etc.

Nomad.NET is developed with support for multi-threading, taking advantage of multi-core CPUs. Nomad.NET requires Microsoft .NET Framework 2.0 or higher.

Features
The following are the main features of the program:

 Full Unicode support.
 Tabbed interface.
 Bookmarks system.
 Powerful search engines, including definition of complex search rules, searching in hex, duplicates search.
 Powerful filtering system, based on the same core as search.
 Customizable visual themes and icon packs.
 Customizable paneling system: single panel or dual panel mode (horizontal or vertical). Each panel can have its own tree view that can be hidden or displayed horizontally or vertically.
 Full internal support for many archive types (using 7-Zip libraries). Program can also handle WCX Total Commander plug-in.
 FTP folders support.
 Drag and drop from explorer.
 Clipboard handling.
 Support for shell shortcuts, URL shortcuts (FTP only) and even shell folder shortcuts.

See also
Comparison of file managers

References

External links
Nomad.Net official webpage

File managers
Orthodox file managers
Portable software